Ángel Alfonso (1901 – death unknown), nicknamed "Cuco", was a Cuban infielder in the Negro leagues between 1924 and 1930. 

A native of Havana, Cuba, Alfonso made his Negro leagues debut in 1969 with the Cuban Stars (West). He played with the club through 1926, then went on to spend the next three seasons with the Cuban Stars (East), and finished his career in 1930 back with the West club. He also played for Habana in the Cuban League in 1927.

References

External links
 and  Seamheads 

1901 births
Place of death missing
Date of birth missing
Year of death missing
Cuban Stars (East) players
Cuban Stars (West) players
Habana players
Baseball players from Havana
Baseball infielders
Cuban expatriate baseball players in the United States